Map of places in Neath Port Talbot compiled from this list
 See the list of places in Wales for places in other principal areas.

This is a list of cities, towns and villages in the principal area of Neath Port Talbot, Wales. See the list of places in Wales for places in other principal areas.

 

A
Aberdulais, Abergwynfi, Alltwen, Aberavon

B
Baglan, Briton Ferry, Bryn, Bryncoch, Blaengwrach, Blaengwynfi

C
Cadoxton, Caewern, Coed Darcy, Cwmafan, Crynant, Cymmer, Cilffriw, Cimla, Clyne

E

F

G
Glynneath, Gwaun-Cae-Gurwen, Glyncorrwg

H

I

J
Jersey Marine

K

L
Llandarcy

M
Margam

N
Neath
Neath Abbey

O
Onllwyn

P
Pontardawe, Pontrhydyfen, Port Talbot, Pontneddfechan

Q

R
Resolven, Rhos

S
Seven Sisters, Skewen, Sandfields

T
Tonna, Taibach

U

V

W

X

Y
Ystalyfera

Z

See also
List of places in Neath Port Talbot (categorised)

Neath Port Talbot